Schlafen family member 13 is a protein that in humans is encoded by the SLFN13 gene.

References

Further reading